Wesley Leonard "Cowboy" Fry (December 10, 1902 – November 11, 1970) was an American football player, coach of football and baseball, and professional football executive. He served as the head football coach at Oklahoma City University in 1933 and at Kansas State University from 1935 to 1939, tallying a career college football coach mark of 26–22–6. Fry was also the head baseball coach at Kansas State from 1935 to 1938 and at Northwestern University from 1944 to 1946, compiling a career college baseball record of 53–53–2. He later served as director of player personnel and then as general manager with the Oakland Raiders of the American Football League (AFL) from 1960 to 1963.

Playing career
Fry played college football at the University of Iowa under legendary coach Howard Jones, excelling as a fullback. He was named to play in the first East–West Shrine Game following his senior season in 1925. Fry then spent the 1926 and 1927 seasons playing professional football with Red Grange for the New York Yankees of the National Football League (NFL). At the same time, Fry attended law school.

Coaching career
After earning his law degree, Fry quit playing professional football and sought to practice law in Oklahoma, but he was quickly diverted onto the path of a football coach. He began his career coaching football at Classen High School in Oklahoma City. In his five seasons at Classen, from 1928 to 1932, his football teams compiled a record of 44–9–1. At Classen, Fry also coached the track team. In 1933, Fry served at the head football coach at Oklahoma City University, leading his squad to an 8–1 record. The following year, when future Hall of Fame coach Pappy Waldorf moved north from Oklahoma A&M to Kansas State University, he hired Fry to be his lone assistant coach. Waldorf left Kansas State after one season, and Fry was hired as the new head coach in 1935.

Fry held the head coaching position at Kansas State for five seasons, posting an 18–21–6 record. Fry also coached the baseball team at Kansas State during this time. Fry stepped aside following the 1939 season when his own assistant coach began politicking for the job of head football coach, but not before coaching the second-ever televised college football game.

For the 1940 season, Fry rejoined Waldorf as an assistant coach at Northwestern University. In 1947, Fry moved with Waldorf to the University of California. Fry remained Waldorf's assistant coach at Cal through the end of Waldorf's term, in 1956, despite receiving offers of head coaching positions from Oregon State University and Arizona State University.

Administrative career and later life
In 1960, Fry joined the Oakland Raiders organization, which was commencing operations as a member of the American Football League. He first served as director of player personnel, then as general manager of the franchise until 1963, when Al Davis was hired as general manager and head coach. Fry died on November 11, 1970 at his home in La Mesa, California.

Head coaching record

College football

References

Additional sources
 Fitzgerald, Tim (2001). Wildcat Gridiron Guide

External links
 

1902 births
1970 deaths
California Golden Bears football coaches
Iowa Hawkeyes football players
New York Yankees (NFL) players
New York Yankees (AFL) players
Kansas State Wildcats baseball coaches
Kansas State Wildcats football coaches
Northwestern Wildcats baseball coaches
Northwestern Wildcats football coaches
Oakland Raiders executives
Oklahoma City Chiefs football coaches
American Football League contributors
High school football coaches in Oklahoma
People from O'Brien County, Iowa
Coaches of American football from Iowa
Players of American football from Iowa